Foer is a surname. Notable people with the surname include:

Esther Safran Foer (born 1946), American writer
Franklin Foer (born 1974), American journalist (The Atlantic, The New Republic)
Jonathan Safran Foer (born 1977), American novelist
Joshua Foer (born 1982), American freelance journalist and non-fiction writer